Sarah Hudson may refer to:

Sarah Hudson (singer) (born 1984), American singer-songwriter
Sarah Hudson (actress) (born 1988), Australian actress